Eupithecia usbeca is a moth in the family Geometridae. It is found in Russia.

References

Moths described in 1992
usbeca
Moths of Europe